Inhibitor or inhibition may refer to:

In biology
 Enzyme inhibitor, a substance that binds to an enzyme and decreases the enzyme's activity
 Reuptake inhibitor, a substance that increases neurotransmission by blocking the reuptake of a neurotransmitter
 Lateral inhibition, a neural mechanism that increases contrast between active and (neighbouring) inactive neurons
 Inhibitory postsynaptic potential, a synaptic potential that decreases the firing of a neuron

In chemistry
 Corrosion inhibitor, a substance that decreases the rate of metal oxidation 
 Reaction inhibitor, a substance that prevents or decreases the rate of a chemical reaction
 Polymerisation inhibitor, a substance that inhibits unwanted polymerisation of monomers

In psychology
 Cognitive inhibition, the mind's ability to tune out irrelevant stimuli 
 Inhibitory control,  a cognitive process that permits an individual to inhibit their impulses 
 Inhibition of return, a feature of attention
 Inhibition theory, a theory pertaining to the performance of a mental task
 Latent inhibition, a term used in classical conditioning
 Memory inhibition, processes that suppress or interfere with specific memories
 Sexual inhibition, reservations relating to sexual practices
 Social inhibition, a conditioned fear reaction to social marginalization or isolation

In popular culture
 Inhibitors, machines in Alastair Reynolds' Revelation Space novels
 Inhibitions (song), a 2008 single by Swedish band Alcazar
 Inhibition (album), the debut album by alternative rock band Dot Hacker

In law
 Inhibition (law)

See also 

 Preservative, a substance that inhibits spoilage
 Embalming, the preservation of human remains
 Food preservation, the inhibition of microbial growth in food
 Nuclear poison, an inhibitor of nuclear reactions
 League of Legends, structure which spawns super minions